The 2021 Route d'Occitanie (known as the La Route d'Occitanie - La Dépêche du Midi for sponsorship reasons) was a road cycling stage race that took place between 10 and 13 June 2021 in the southern French region of Occitanie. The race was the 45th edition of the Route d'Occitanie and was rated as a category 2.1 event on the 2021 UCI Europe Tour.

Teams 
Eight of the nineteen UCI WorldTeams, eight UCI ProTeams, three UCI Continental teams, and the French national team made up the twenty-teams that participated in the race. Only three teams did not enter a full squad of seven riders:  and  entered five riders each, while  entered six riders. Of the 135 riders who started the race, 107 finished.

UCI WorldTeams

 
 
 
 
 
 
 
 

UCI ProTeams

 
 
 
 
 
 
 
 

UCI Continental Teams

 
 
 

National Teams

 France

Route

Stages

Stage 1 
10 June 2021 – Cazouls-lès-Béziers to Lacaune-les-Bains,

Stage 2 
11 June 2021 – Villefranche-de-Rouergue to Auch,

Stage 3 
12 June 2021 – Pierrefitte-Nestalas to Le Mourtis,

Stage 4 
13 June 2021 – Lavelanet–Pays d'Olmes to Duilhac-sous-Peyrepertuse,

Classification leadership table 

 On stage 2, Magnus Cort, who was second in the points classification, wore the green jersey, because first placed Andrea Vendrame wore the orange jersey as the leader of the general classification.

Final classification standings

General classification

Points classification

Mountains classification

Young rider classification

Team classification

References

External links 
 

2021 UCI Europe Tour
2021 in French sport
June 2021 sports events in France